The FIM E-Bike Cross World Cup is the premier competition organized by FIM on the sport of e-bike racing. The competition started in 2019 in the middle of disputes between FIM and UCI over which governing body would govern the e-bike sports.

Men medallists

EX1

EX2

EX3

Women medallists

EX1

EX2

References

World motorcycle racing series
Motorcycle off-road racing series